Bhairab K. B. Pilot Model High School is a secondary school situated in the middle of Bhairab Upazila, Kishoreganj District, Bangladesh. It was founded in 1919. Mr. Kadir Bokhs Sarkar was the founder of it. It is also one of the oldest schools in Bangladesh.

It has a big "U" shaped building and a huge playing field for its students. It has over 3,000 students and 52 teachers.

References

Schools in Kishoreganj District
High schools in Bangladesh
Educational institutions established in 1919
1919 establishments in India